The AK-203 is a Russian gas-operated, magazine-fed, select fire assault rifle designed to chamber the 7.62×39mm cartridge. It is one of the latest iterations of the AK series of assault rifles originally designed by Mikhail Kalashnikov. The AK-203 was developed in the 2010s by Kalashnikov Concern in Russia. The firearm was originally known as AK-103M before being renamed to AK-203 in 2019.

History
The prototype development of predecessor of AK-203 rifle, dubbed as AK-200 series began in 2007. The first prototype of AK-200 was developed and tested in 2010. In 2013, for the Ratnik programme AK-200 was modified and renamed as AK-103-3. In 2016, AK-200 series project was revived and upgraded the AK-103-3 assault rifle prototype with KM-AK kit developed as part of the Obves programme. The upgraded assault rifle prototype was initially designated as AK-300 and then as AK-100M and finally in 2019 as AK-203.

The Indian Army is procuring 670,000 AK-203 assault rifles to replace the INSAS, through a contract with Russia. The first 70,000 rifles were purchased from Russia and delivered in January 2022. The remaining 600,000 rifles will be manufactured in Amethi, India under a transfer of technology agreement, by joint venture company Indo-Russia Rifles Private Limited (IRRPL).

Users

 : Placed an order for 670,000 rifles; around 70,000 would be purchased off the shelf, and the remaining 600,000 would be manufactured in India under ToT. On 25 January 2022, the first batch of 70,000 AK-203s delivered to Indian Armed Forces. Licensed production started in January 2023.
 : In limited use by Russian Special Forces

References

7.62×39mm assault rifles
Kalashnikov Concern products
Kalashnikov derivatives
Assault rifles of Russia